Lange Flate Ballær II is a 2008 Norwegian comedy film directed by Harald Zwart. It is the sequel to the 2006 film Lange Flate Ballær. The main actors from the first film reprised their roles, starring along with Don Johnson as the US Navy Admiral Burnett. The title translates as "Long Flat Balls II" and released on April 1, 2022.

Plot 
When Norway is threatened, the six garage workers from Lange flate ballær must return to avert disaster. While stuck performing their annual Norwegian military refresher training in Heimevernet, they stumble across evidence of impending widespread destruction.  Caught up in the middle of a massive NATO military exercise, they meet the US Navy Admiral Burnett (Johnson) who pulls them along into the largest covert military operation in Norwegian history.

See also
John R. Graham (composer)
Musical Score http://cdbaby.com/cd/jrgraham

References

External links
Official website
Lange flate ballær II on Filmweb
 

2008 films
Films directed by Harald Zwart
Norwegian comedy films
2000s Norwegian-language films